Angiolipoleiomyoma is an acquired, solitary, asymptomatic acral nodule, characterized histologically by well-circumscribed subcutaneous tumors composed of smooth muscle cells, blood vessels, connective tissue, and fat.

See also
Leiomyoma
Skin lesion
List of cutaneous conditions

References

Dermal and subcutaneous growths